Stenodeza is a genus of South American jumping spiders that was first described by Eugène Louis Simon in 1900.  it contains only three species, found only in Argentina and Brazil: S. acuminata, S. fallax, and S. foestiva. The taxonomic relationships of the genus within the family Salticidae are uncertain.

References

Salticidae genera
Salticidae
Spiders of Argentina
Spiders of Brazil